Morsztyn can refer to three Polish writers of that surname:
 Hieronim Morsztyn (ca.1581-1623)
 Jan Andrzej Morsztyn (1621-1693)
 Zbigniew Morsztyn (1627-1689)